The Eggers and Company General Store is a historic general store located at Farrar, Perry County, Missouri.  It was built in 1894, and is a two-story, frame building on a limestone foundation and clad in weatherboard.  Attached to the store is a 1 1/2-story frame dwelling clad in weatherboard.  Also on the property are the contributing tin feed warehouse (c. 1905) and a transverse crib barn (c. 1900).

It was listed on the National Register of Historic Places in 2007.

References

Commercial buildings on the National Register of Historic Places in Missouri
Commercial buildings completed in 1894
Buildings and structures in Perry County, Missouri
National Register of Historic Places in Perry County, Missouri
General stores in the United States